Chiling Sumda is a village in the Leh district of Ladakh, India. It is located in the Likir tehsil, on the bank of the Indus river in Ladakh region. It serves as a base camp for the Chadar Trek in the winters and is used to raft the Zanskar river in the summers.

Demographics
According to the 2011 census of India, Chiling Sumda has 31 households. The effective literacy rate (i.e. the literacy rate of population excluding children aged 6 and below) is 59.31%.

References

Villages in Likir tehsil